The 1977–78 Kansas Jayhawks men's basketball team represented the University of Kansas during the 1977–78 NCAA Division I men's basketball season.

Roster
Darnell Valentine
John Douglas
Ken Koenigs
Donnie Von Moore
Paul Mokeski
Clint Johnson
Wilmore Fowler
Brad Sanders
Scott Anderson
Hasan Houston
Douglas Booty Neal
Mac Stallcup
Milt Gibson
John Crawford
David Verser

Schedule

References

Kansas Jayhawks men's basketball seasons
Kansas
Kansas
Kansas Jay
Kansas Jay